These are the results of the 1998 IAAF World Cup, which took place in Johannesburg, South Africa on 11, 12 and 13 September 1998.

Results

100 m

200 m

400 m

800 m

1500 m

3000 m

5000 m

3000 m Steeplechase

100/110 m hurdles

400 m hurdles

High jump

Pole vault

Long jump

Triple jump

Shot put

Discus

Hammer

Javelin

4 × 100 m relay

4 × 400 m relay

References

Competition results
 Results
Full Results by IAAF

IAAF World Cup results
Events at the IAAF Continental Cups